Jagtar Singh Jagga Hissowal is a member of the Punjab Legislative Assembly from Raikot constituency. He won the 2017 legislative election on the Aam Aadmi Party ticket by defeating Congress candidate Dr. Amar Singh. He used to be a local teacher until he retired to throw his hat into the political ring. In family life, he has a non controversial marriage and has two children. Currently, he is a member of the Committee of Local Bodies and Panchayat Raj Institutions in the Punjabi Vidhan Sabha. 

In November 2021, Jagtar Singh had switched over to the Congress party’s side in the Punjab Legislative Assembly and declared his support behind Charanjit Singh Channi to be Punjab’s new Chief Minister.

References

Former members of Aam Aadmi Party from Punjab
Punjabi politicians
1974 births
Living people
Indian National Congress politicians from Punjab, India